KXTS (98.7 FM) is a radio station broadcasting a Regional Mexican format. Licensed to Geyserville, California, United States, it serves the Santa Rosa area. The station is currently owned by Commonwealth Broadcasting, LLC. The station had previously been broadcasting on 100.9 FM until a frequency swap with KSXY on February 8, 2008. The call signs had been swapped the previous week.

The station started out as KRSH (The Krush) until 2002 when it was also involved in a frequency swap with KSXY, known then as Sexy 95.9. KRSH was not involved in the current frequency swap and is still broadcasting on 95.9 FM.

External links

Sonoma County, California
XTS
XTS